Bradley Mark Thomas (born 29 March 1984) is a footballer, primarily as a centre back.

Career
After leaving Rokeby School, East London, he started his career under Barry Fry at Peterborough United but failed to make a first-team appearance, being loaned out to Kettering Town, Aldershot Town, Heybridge Swifts, Welling United and Weymouth.

He made the switch to Eastleigh in the summer of 2005 but his stay in Hampshire was to be a short one as he was signed by Yeovil Town in January 2006, following the departures of Luke Oliver and Efe Sodje. Whilst at Huish Park, he struggled to break into the first-team, having to settle for a solitary FA Cup substitute appearance.

Further loan spells at Tamworth and Boston United provided more regular first-team football. Thomas was ultimately released by Yeovil in the summer of 2007.

Thomas signed for Crawley Town in June 2007, becoming one of Steve Evans' first signings for the club. He had a previous spell under Evans, whilst on loan at Boston United.

Thomas started the 2007–08 season in the Crawley first team but suffered a broken fibula in a friendly versus a Tottenham Hotspur XI in late August 2007, meaning he missed a large chunk of the season. He returned to the Crawley side in February 2008, in the home defeat to Ebbsfleet United and established himself as a regular fixture in the side during the last two months of the season. The player agreed a deal to stay at Crawley for the 2008–09 Conference National season.

He went on to join King's Lynn in the Conference North in 2008, where he made a total of 26 appearances in all competitions, scoring twice.

Thomas appeared for Sutton United in the FA Cup Fourth Qualifying round tie against Hampton & Richmond Borough in which United won 3–1. Thomas missed his mother's wedding to play in this game, which was featured on ITV the next day. In December 2009, Thomas signed for Hendon.

Thomas joined Braintree Town on 15 July 2010 after a trial spell, before joining Grays Athletic in November 2010. He left Grays in March 2012. However, after discussions with the club, Thomas later agreed to stay with Grays Athletic.

References

External links

1984 births
Living people
People from Nailsworth
English footballers
Peterborough United F.C. players
Kettering Town F.C. players
Aldershot Town F.C. players
Heybridge Swifts F.C. players
Weymouth F.C. players
Eastleigh F.C. players
Yeovil Town F.C. players
Tamworth F.C. players
Boston United F.C. players
Crawley Town F.C. players
King's Lynn F.C. players
Sutton United F.C. players
Hendon F.C. players
Braintree Town F.C. players
Concord Rangers F.C. players
Grays Athletic F.C. players
A.F.C. Sudbury players
English Football League players
National League (English football) players
Isthmian League players
Sportspeople from Gloucestershire
Association football defenders